Nia Nicole Abdallah (born January 24, 1984 in Houston, Texas) is the 2004 Olympic silver medalist and the first U.S. woman to officially medal in Taekwondo at the Olympics. In 2007 Nia received the highest honor in the martial art / Olympic sport of Taekwondo when she was inducted into the Official Taekwondo Hall of Fame®.

Early life 
Abdallah was born and raised in Houston, Texas was introduced to Taekwondo by her stepfather when she was nine years old. He and her mother recognized her athleticism even at this young age.  After graduating from George Washington Carver High School in Houston, She went to live in Colorado Springs at the Olympic Training Center. After training there, she went on to compete, first in open class international competition, then on the world and olympic level.

2004 Athens 
Abdallah represented her country winning the silver medal becoming the first and youngest American female, to win a medal in the olympics in Taekwondo since 1992. The Olympic games was her 3rd World international competition.

2008 Olympic Trials 
While trying to earn her spot to compete for her second gold medal in the 2008 Summer Olympics, in Beijing, Abdallah found herself at the center of controversy. Diana Lopez was receiving national attention for her hopes of joining her two brothers representing the United States in Taekwondo. After 3 rounds of the final bout between, Abdallah and Lopez had no points had been scored, and the fight went into Sudden Death Overtime where Lopez allegedly scored a winning kick. Abdallah's loss was controversial due to points judges did not count.

2012 Olympic Trials 
Suffering from long term injures, Nia Abdallah decided to try for one last Olympic team. Fighting 7 fights in one day, she earned her spot in the Olympic trials for the 3rd Olympics. She fell short to Paige McPherson who went on to win a bronze in London. This marked the end of a Nia's athletic career. She then went on to focus on coaching.

Coaching 
In the months following her retirement, Nia has become the Texas state women's head coach and has started her own competition team named "Team Bacho" in her hometown of Houston Texas. Her goal is to become the United States first female head coach. Nia is also travelling around the country teaching seminars.

Motivational Speaking 
Nia is now sharing her message of "Living Like A Champion thru BACHO". She is currently speaking to many schools, businesses, churches, and organizations on how they can be a better them by using the same steps that it takes to become a great athlete. She shares this knowledge on her radio show every week on www.blogtalkradio.com/livelikeachampion at 5:30 pm cst. The show has been picked up on iTunes as a podcast and is avaliale for download. On her webpage, BACHO bags, bands, and shirts can be purchased.

Abdallah's competition record 
2010  U.S. Open (welter): bronze 
2009  U.S. National Team Member (Welter)
2008  Olympic Trials (Feather): 2nd
2007 World Championships: bronze 
2007  National Collegiate Championships (Light): gold
2007  U.S. National Team Member (Light)
2007  U.S. Open (Light): bronze
2006  Dutch Open (Light): silver
2006 Pan Am Championships (light): silver
2006  U.S. National Team Member (Light)
2006 National Collegiate Championships (welter): gold
2005 U.S Senior Nationals (light): Silver (National Team member)
2004 Olympic Games: silver
2003 Pan Am Games: bronze
2003 U.S. Open: gold
2003 U.S. Senior Nationals: Silver
2002 U.S. Open: gold
2001 U.S. Open: gold
2001 U.S. Senior Nationals: gold

References 
 Nia Abdallah at USA Taekwondo

External links 
 
 

1984 births
Living people
American female taekwondo practitioners
Taekwondo practitioners at the 2004 Summer Olympics
Olympic silver medalists for the United States in taekwondo
Sportspeople from Houston
Medalists at the 2004 Summer Olympics
Pan American Games bronze medalists for the United States
Pan American Games medalists in taekwondo
Taekwondo practitioners at the 2003 Pan American Games
World Taekwondo Championships medalists
Medalists at the 2003 Pan American Games
21st-century American women